Blake Morton (born March 17, 1991) is an American curler from McFarland, Wisconsin.

Career
Morton has played in two United States Men's Junior Curling Championships, finishing third in 2009 and 7th in 2010. Also in 2010, he played in his first national men's championship, finishing with a 3–6 record, in 9th place.

Morton skipped for the U.S. team at the 2011 Winter Universiade, where the U.S. finished with a 4–5 record in 7th place.

Morton returned to the United States Junior Curling Championships the next year, and lost in the final to Stephen Dropkin. He then participated in the 2012 United States Men's Curling Championship after qualifying for the nationals through the Green Bay qualifier, and finished in last place with a 1–9 record.

Morton joined Eric Fenson with teammate Calvin Weber in the 2012–13 curling season.

Personal life
Morton is currently studying management, human resources, and marketing at the University of Wisconsin–Madison.

Teams

External links
 

1991 births
Living people
American male curlers
People from McFarland, Wisconsin